Grant Carter (born September 30, 1970) is a former Canadian football defensive end and linebacker in the Canadian Football League who played for the Baltimore CFL Colts, Montreal Alouettes, Winnipeg Blue Bombers, and Edmonton Eskimos. He played college football for the Pacific Tigers.

References

1970 births
Living people
American football linebackers
American football defensive linemen
Canadian football defensive linemen
Canadian football linebackers
Montreal Alouettes players
Winnipeg Blue Bombers players
Edmonton Elks players
Pacific Tigers football players